Tad Marks (born 1954) is an  American folk and bluegrass fiddle player.

Music
He spent his youth in Ambler, Pennsylvania. Played and performed with Bob Doyle and the Allegheny String Band, the Twigg Brothers,Buzz Busby,Bill Harrell,Whetstone Run, Hazel Dickens, Ola Belle Reed, Wade and Julia Mainer, Del McCoury and many folk, bluegrass and Country artists. He has recorded for soundtracks and worked for a time playing in jingles and Television commercials. Marks studied music composition and arts at Penn State University, won numerous awards for fiddling, and is currently a violin repairman and bluegrass /folk fiddler in the Baltimore/Washington DC area. Marks has performed and toured with many bluegrass, country and Celtic acts and is widely recorded. In addition to his work with the Del McCoury Band; Marks has performed with Lynn Morris, James King, Kate MacKenzie, Charlie Zahm, Bob Perilla's Big Hillbilly Bluegrass.

Discography

CDs
Tad Marks - Callin' in the Dogs
Tad Marks – Our Crazy Love Affair
Tad Marks – The Back Road Road
Tad Marks – The Highlander's Farewell
The Del McCoury Band – Blue Side of Town
The Del McCoury Band – High Lonesome and Blue
The Del McCoury Band – By Request
Charlie Zahm – Festival Favorites 2
Charlie Zahm – The Celtic Balladeer
Charlie Zahm – A Walk in the Irish Rain
Charlie Zahm – The White Snows of Winter
Charlie Zahm – Americana
Charlie Zahm – Out of the Mist
Charlie Zahm – Lighthouse on the Shore
Charlie Zahm – The American Scrapbook
Charlie Zahm – Among the Heather
Charlie Zahm – Recent Journeys
Charlie Zahm – Songs of Highlands, Islands and Home
Esther Haynes
Danny Doyle – Spirit of the Gael
Seamus Kennedy – A Smile and a Tear
Seamus Kennedy – Party Pieces
Seamus Kennedy – Sailing Ships and Sailing Men
The King Brothers
David Massey – Blissful State of Blue
Bob Perilla's Big Hillbilly Bluegrass-Big Hillbilly Bluegrass
Bob Perilla – Chesapeake Moon
Kevin Marvelle – Love's the Reason
Marti Brom – Not For Nothin'

DVD
Bob Perilla's Big Hillbilly Bluegrass – A Bluegrass Band's Tour of Armenia
Charlie Zahm – Lighthouse on the Shore

References 

Living people
1954 births
American fiddlers
Place of birth missing (living people)
21st-century violinists
Del McCoury Band members